The Korean spice sancho is made from Zanthoxylum schinifolium, which is less bitter than chopi made from Zanthoxylum piperitum. In Korean cuisine, sancho is often used to accompany fish soups such as chueo-tang.

References

Spices
Korean condiments